Sabre Jet may refer to:

Sabre Jet (film), a 1953 Korean War film
North American F-86 Sabre, a jet fighter aircraft
North American F-100 Super Sabre, a jet fighter aircraft
North American Sabreliner, a mid-size business jet